Shoaib Iqbal (born 1 May 1958) is an Indian politician and a  member of Delhi Legislative Assembly. He is 6 times MLA from Matia Mahal (Vidhan Sabha constituency).

Personal life 
Shoaib Iqbal was married in 1960 and having two sons Aaley Muhammad Iqbal and Ahmed Hasan Iqbal. Aaley Muhammad Iqbal is Deputy Mayor of MCD.

Shoaib Iqbal's  family is also active in Old Delhi politics. His nephew Khurram Iqbal was a Councillor from Jama Masjid.His nephew's mother in law Sultana Abad Khan is the Councillor from Jama Masjid Ward.

In the 2022 Delhi MCD elections, Shoaib Iqbal managed to get his close aide Hafiz's daughter Rafia Mahir elected as Councillor from Sita Ram Bazar Ward.

Political career 
Shoaib Iqbal was active in student politics during his college days, and was the Secretary at the "Zakir Husain Students Union".

Shoaib Iqbal has earned a reputation in early days by harassing poor people and demanding money from them to carry out construction activities. After the MCD officials tried to stop an illegal construction, Iqbal assaulted their officer. He was also involved in the controversial land deal between an alleged local mafia and Dubai-based company to open a luxury hotel near the Jama Masjid. 

Shoaib contested his first election in 1993 on Janata Dal ticket. Later, he joined Janata Dal (United) and headed Minority Morcha of the Party. In 2014, he joined Indian National Congress party and subsequently won Delhi Legislative Assembly elections from Matia Mahal (Vidhan Sabha constituency) for five terms in 1993, 1998, 2003, 2008 and 2013. Shoaib was defeated by Asim Ahmed Khan of Aam Aadmi Party in 2015 Assembly Elections.
In 2020, Shoaib Iqbal joined the ruling Aam Aadmi Party, right before 2020 Delhi Legislative Assembly election. He also served as Deputy Speaker of Delhi Legislative Assembly.

Positions held

Electoral performance

References 

Delhi MLAs 2013–2015
Living people
Place of birth missing (living people)
Indian National Congress politicians
Janata Dal (United) politicians
Janata Dal politicians
Lok Janshakti Party politicians
1958 births
Janata Dal (Secular) politicians
Aam Aadmi Party politicians from Delhi
Delhi MLAs 2020–2025